Ghashm is a sub-district located in Khamir District, 'Amran Governorate, Yemen. Ghashm had a population of 15213 according to the 2004 census.

References 

Sub-districts in Khamir District